The flag of the Republic of Dagestan was adopted after the transformation of the Dagestan ASSR into the Republic of Dagestan within the Russian Federation.  The flag was formally adopted on 26 February 1994.  It features a horizontal tricolor of green (for Islam), blue (for the Caspian Sea), and red (for courage and fidelity).  On 19 November 2003 the proportion of the flag was changed from the original 1:2 to 2:3, and the middle stripe from light blue to blue.

Colours scheme

The official colours scheme was declared in 19 November 2003.

Historical flags
Following its formation from parts of the Mountainous Republic of the Northern Caucasus in 1921, the Dagestan Autonomous Soviet Socialist Republic had several flags of the standard ASSR, first red flags defaced with the initials of the ASSR name (i.e. "") and then a RSFSR flag defaced with the same. A flag with horizontal blue and yellow stripes may have been used briefly in 1993 and 1994 until a variation of the current horizontal tricolor was adopted in 1994.

Other flags
Several peoples in Dagestan have devised their own ethnic flags:

See also
Flag of Russia
Coat of arms of Dagestan

References

Culture of Dagestan
Dagestan
Dagestan
Dagestan